The Ministry of Economy is a ministry under the Malaysian government. The ministry was formed on 21 May 2018, as part of economic reforms by Prime Minister Mahathir Mohamad. The Ministry was reinstated and renamed to the Ministry of Economy in the Anwar Ibrahim cabinet. The current Minister of Economy has been Rafizi Ramli since 3 December 2022.

See also
 Minister of Economy (Malaysia)
 Ministry of Finance (Malaysia)

References

External links
 Official Website

Finance in Malaysia
Federal ministries, departments and agencies of Malaysia
Ministries established in 2018
2018 establishments in Malaysia